Louis-Philippe Dury (born June 23, 1992) is a film and television actor from Quebec.

Filmography

Film 
 2001 : Ice Cream, Chocolate and Other Consolations (Crème glacée, chocolat et autres consolations) : Jérémi
 2003 : Seducing Doctor Lewis (La Grande Séduction) : Jules Auger
 2004 : Machine Gun Molly (Monica la mitraille) : Maurice
 2006 : The Rip-Off : Kid
 2006 : La Belle Empoisonneuse : Homère

 Television 
 2002-2003 : Mon meilleur ennemi : Simon fils de Claire
 2006 : Providence : un écolier
 2007 : Nos étés'' : Bengamin Forget

References

External links
Agence Sylvie Leclecr/Louis-Philippe Dury

Box Office Québec
Star Pluse
Mooviees
Locate TV

1992 births
Living people
Canadian male television actors
Canadian male film actors
Male actors from Quebec